Nicholas Michael Spooner (born 5 June 1971) is an English football coach and former professional footballer who is the manager of Hyde United.

As a player, he was a defender and midfielder who notably played in the Premier League for Bolton Wanderers. He also played in the Football League with Oldham Athletic and Chester City, in the United States with Charleston Battery and in non-league with Leigh RMI.

Playing career
Born in Manchester, Spooner played for Bolton Wanderers, Oldham Athletic, Charleston Battery, Chester City and Leigh RMI.

He joined Bolton Wanderers in 1987 after signing YTS forms. His senior career with the club was marred by injury. In October 1994 he suffered a broken leg in a match against Burnley following a tackle by John Gayle, and he never played first-team football for the club again. He finally left Bolton in 1999 and moved to the United States, spending a year with Charleston Battery before returning to England to play non-league football for the final years of his playing career. He played for Hyde United in 2003.

Coaching career
Spooner returned to Bolton Wanderers as a youth coach and initially coached the under-8s' team. In November 2011, Spooner was working as the under-16 coach, and in January 2013 he was the club's Head of Youth Development. In September 2016, he was promoted to under-18s' head coach. He left Bolton on 29 January 2021 after 17 years in his coaching roles.

On 8 June 2021, he was appointed as the new Youth Team Coach at FC Halifax Town.

In February 2022, he was appointed as the new manager of Hyde United, replacing former Stockport County and Port Vale manager Jim Gannon.

References

External links

1971 births
Living people
English footballers
Bolton Wanderers F.C. players
Oldham Athletic A.F.C. players
Charleston Battery players
Chester City F.C. players
Leigh Genesis F.C. players
Hyde United F.C. players
English Football League players
National League (English football) players
Northern Premier League players
Association football defenders
Association football midfielders
Footballers from Manchester
English expatriate footballers
English expatriate sportspeople in the United States
Expatriate soccer players in the United States
Association football coaches
Bolton Wanderers F.C. non-playing staff
FC Halifax Town non-playing staff
Hyde United F.C. managers